Andreas Heusser (born 1976) is a Swiss conceptual artist and curator, based in Zurich and Johannesburg.

Education 
After completing the intermediate diploma in psychology (1999–2001), Andreas Heusser studied philosophy and German literature at the University of Zurich, closing with a master's degree in both subjects (2003). Between 2011 and 2013 he attended the Bern University of Arts and completed another master's degree in contemporary arts practice (fine arts).

Exploration of nothing 
Since 2013, Andreas Heusser has devoted himself to the exploration of nothing in art, philosophy and science. This has developed into the No Show Museum, a museum dedicated to nothing and its various manifestations throughout the history of art. The museum's collection includes around 500 works and documents from over 150 international artists of the 20th and 21st centuries. The museum also has a mobile presentation space in a converted postal car. In 2015, the No Show Museum started a world tour with the mission to spread nothing: The first stage led from July to October 2015 through Europe, staging around 30 exhibitions in 20 different countries, before the museum was arriving in Italy and participating at the 56th Venice Art Biennale. In the summer of 2016, the mobile museum was shipped from Europe to America: The 80-day exhibition tour led from New York to Canada, then to the West Coast of the U.S., and finally down to Baja California Sur, Mexico. The third stage of the world tour took place from November 2017 to January 2018 and led from Mexico through the countries of Central America to Colombia. The fourth stage led from October to November 2018 through Western Europe with exhibitions in France, Spain and Portugal, including a show the Museum of Art, Architecture and Technology (MAAT) in Lisbon.

Political art projects 
As an artist, Andreas Heusser became first known for a series of satirical long-term projects that bridge the gap between art and activism, among them: 
 War Development Aid (KEH, launched 2009 with Nüssli/Oeschger), was aimed to expose the hypocrisies on politicians who subordinate their Christian and humanitarian principles to the interests of the arms industry.
 Organization to Solve the Foreigner Question (OLAF, launched 2010 with Nüssli/Oeschger), was conceived as a counterpropaganda to the xenophobic campaign of the Swiss right wing party (SVP) which demanded to expel all criminal foreigners. OLAF pretended to be a close ally and partner organization of the SVP, but it was so extreme in its claims that it became ridiculous. 
 Christian Humanitarian Asylum Self-Aid Organization Switzerland (CHASOS, 2011) was a satirical reaction on how media and politicians reinforced xenophobic prejudices by evoking the dystopia of gigantic waves of refugees after the Arab Spring.

All three were fictional organizations which imitated and parodied real institutions. The projects mainly took place outside of art institutions, and involved counterfeiting websites, propaganda videos, press releases, social media, and other forms of dissemination. Tactics like provocation, public interventions and hoaxes were used to create controversy and generate media coverage in dominant media outlets. Despite the satiric content, the fake organizations and fictitious characters were often mistaken for real.

Curatorial works

Literaturfestival Zürich 
Andreas Heusser is the founder and director of the Literaturfestival Zürich (formerly: Openair Literatur Festival Zürich), an international week-long literary festival which has taken place annually in Zurich since 2013. The festival is jointly presented by Kaufleuten and Literaturhaus Zurich in cooperation with other cultural institutions. The festival has featured artists of international renown, such as John M. Coetzee, Junot Diaz, Julian Barnes, Roxane Gay, John Banville, John Cleese, Rebecca Solnit, David Mitchell (author), Carolin Emcke.

The Institute 
Andreas Heusser is a founding member and co-director of The Institute, a project space for performing and transdisciplinary arts in Zurich. Several artists collectives from different artistic fields (film, music, dance, literature, performance) are involved and contribute with weekly events and performances to the public programme of the venue which also includes research and workshops.

Kaufleuten 
Between 2011 and 2013, Andreas Heusser was the program director of the cultural venue "Kaufleuten" where he was responsible for the curation and implementation of around 200 cultural events per year, including concerts by international artists and bands, readings, podiums and cabaret events.

Series and festivals 
In 2001, Andreas Heusser and Marc Rychener founded the interdisciplinary artist collective index based in Zurich. With index he organized a number of concert series, performances and festivals (e.g. "Festival der Künste" 2002, "Lyrik am Fluss" 2002–2005). In 2005, he initiated the international Artist-in-Residence-program Freiraum-Stipendium which is open to artists from all disciplines. In 2005, Andreas Heusser converted his artist studio at Elisabethenstrasse 14a into a cultural venue, where he staged 3–4 events per month until 2011, including a program cinema ("Kino im Atelier") and the concert and performance series "Mikro".

Solo exhibitions
 Kunsthalle Bratislava, Slovak Union, 10/2019
 Valie Export Center, Linz, Austria, 10/2019
 La station – Gare des Mines / Garage MU in Paris, France, 11/2018
 Espacio Naranjo in Madrid, Spain, 11/2018
 Espacio Oculto in Madrid, Spain, 11/2018
 Museum of Art, Architecture and Technology (MAAT) in Lisbon, Portugal, 11/2018
 MUTUO Centro de Arte en Barcelona, Spain, 10/2018
 Museo de Arte Contemporáneo de Bogota, Colombia, 1/2018
 Galería Antítesis, Panama City, Panama, 1/2018
 Centro de Arte Despacio, San José, Costa Rica, 12/2017
 Galería Códice, Managua, Nicaragua, 12/2017
 Museo para la Identidad Nacional, Tegucigalpa, Honduras, 12/2017
 Museo de Arte de El Salvador (MARTE), San Salvador, El Salvador, 12/2017
 Galería El Sótano, Guatemala City, Guatemala, 11/2017
 Museo de Arte Contemporáneo de Oaxaca (MACO), Oaxaca, Mexico, 11/2017
 Galería Ladrón, Mexico City, Mexico, 11/2017
 Museum of Emptiness (MOE), St. Gallen, Switzerland, 9/2017
 Monte Vista Projects, Los Angeles, California, USA, 10/2016
 CULT | Aimee Friberg Exhibitions, San Francisco, California, USA, 10/2016
 CCA Center for Contemporary Arts, Santa Fe, New Mexico, USA, 10/2016
 Ice Cube Gallery, Denver, Colorado, USA, 09/2016
 Fort Gondo, St. Louis, Missouri, USA, 09/2016 
 Defibrillator Gallery, Chicago, Illinois, USA, 09/2016
 Spread Arts Gallery, Detroit, Michigan, USA, 09/2016
 Scrap Metal Gallery, Toronto, Canada, 09/2016
 Enriched Bread Artists, Ottawa, Canada, 08/2016
 Die Diele, Zürich, Switzerland, 08/2016-9/2016
 Fresh Window Gallery, New York, USA, 08/2016
 56. Biennale di Venezia, Salon Suisse / Palazzo Trevisan and Lido, Venice, Italy, 10/2015
 Lauba Gallery, Zagreb, Croatia, 10/2015
 Chimera-Project Gallery, Budapest, Hungary, 10/2015
 Umelka Gallery, Bratislava, Slovakia, 09/2015
 Vienna Contemporary, International Art Fair, Vienna, Austria, 09/2015
 #Poligon Art Space, Warsaw, Poland, 09/2015
 Tallinn Art Hall, Estonia, 09/2015
 Luda Gallery, St. Petersburg, Russia, 09/2015
 Kiasma, Museum of Contemporary Art, Helsinki, Finland, 08/2015
 Tenthaus, Project Space, Oslo, Norway, 08/2015
 Sixtyeight, Project Space, Copenhagen, Danmark, 08/2015
 Grimmuseum, Berlin, Germany, 08/2015
 Island, Project Space, Hamburg, Germany, 08/2015
 Wolfart Project Space, Rotterdam, Netherlands, 08/2015
 Museum Strauhof, Zürich, Switzerland, 07/2015
 The Institute, Zürich, Switzerland, 05/2015

Group exhibitions
 City of Zurich Art Awards Exhibition, Helmhaus Zurich, 2019
 "Ours Is Not The Only Planet Earth Has Been", Ballroom Projects, Chicago, 10/2016
 d.i.v.o. Institute, Kolin, Czech Republic, 09/2015
 Survival K(n)it Festival 7, Latvian Centre for Contemporary Art, Riga, Latvia, 09/2015
 Kling-Festival, Mansbach, Germany, 08/2015
 "Vitrine 05", Die Diele, Zürich, Switzerland, 12/2015
 Kabinett der Visionäre, Chur, Switzerland, 06/2015
 Doing Nothing Festival, Dock 18, Rote Fabrik, Zürich, Switzerland, 5/2015
 "Vitrine 04", Die Diele, Zürich, Switzerland, 12/2014
 "Vitrine 03", Die Diele, Zürich, Switzerland, 12/2013
 "Show Me Show Me Show Me", CentrePasqArt, Biel, Switzerland, 6/2013
 Swiss Art Awards, Art Basel, Switzerland, 6/2011
 Werkpreis Kanton Zürich, F+F Schule, Zürich, Switzerland, 10/2011

Awards and grants 
 2019 City of Zurich Art Award for No Show Museum - From Dada to Nada
 2012 Award for Communication of Arts, Popkredit, City of Zurich
 2011 Swiss Art Award, Nomination, National prize competition for Art
 2011 Werkpreis Kanton Zürich, Nomination
 2005 1st prize winner of fiction contest of Solothurner Literaturtage
 2002 Grant of Vontobel Foundation

See also
No Show Museum
OLAF (Organization to solve the foreigner question)
KEH (War Development Aid)
CHASOS
Openair Literatur Festival Zürich

References

External links 
 Website of Andreas Heusser

Swiss contemporary artists
Conceptual artists
Political artists
Swiss performance artists
Swiss curators
Institutional Critique artists
1976 births
Festival directors
Living people
Culture jamming
Swiss activists